Csikéria is a  village in Bács-Kiskun County, in the Southern Great Plain region of Hungary.

Geography

Demography 
 Magyars
 Croats
 Bunjevci

External links 
csikeria.hu

Populated places in Bács-Kiskun County